USS John C. Stennis (CVN-74), named for Senator John C. Stennis of Mississippi, is the seventh of the -class of nuclear-powered supercarriers in the United States Navy.

She was commissioned on 9 December 1995. Her home port is temporarily Norfolk, Virginia, for her scheduled refueling and complex overhaul (RCOH), which began in 2019. After her overhaul is completed sometime in the 2020s, she is scheduled to return to Bremerton, Washington.

Mission and capabilities

The mission of John C. Stennis and her air wing (CVW-9) is to conduct sustained combat air operations while forward-deployed. The embarked air wing consists of eight to nine squadrons. Attached aircraft are Navy and Marine Corps F/A-18 Hornet, EA-18G Growler, MH-60R, MH-60S, and E-2C Hawkeye.

The air wing can engage enemy aircraft, submarines, and land targets, or lay mines hundreds of miles from the ship. John C. Stenniss aircraft are used to conduct strikes, support land battles, protect the battle group or other friendly shipping, and implement a sea or air blockade. The air wing provides a visible presence to demonstrate American power and resolve in a crisis. The ship normally operates as the centerpiece of a carrier battle group commanded by a flag officer embarked upon John C. Stennis and consisting of four to six other ships.

John C. Stenniss two nuclear reactors give her virtually unlimited range and endurance and a top speed in excess of 30 knots (56 km/h, 34.5 mph). The ship's four catapults and four arresting gear engines enable her to launch and recover aircraft rapidly and simultaneously. John C. Stennis also has extensive repair capabilities, including a fully equipped Aircraft Intermediate Maintenance Department, a micro-miniature electronics repair shop, and numerous ship repair shops.

For defense, in addition to her air wing and accompanying vessels, John C. Stennis has NATO RIM-7 Sea Sparrow and Rolling Airframe Missile (RAM) surface-to-air missile systems, the Phalanx Close-in Weapons System for cruise missile defense, and the AN/SLQ-32 Electronic Warfare System.

History
The nuclear-powered USS John C. Stennis (CVN 74) was contracted on 29 March 1988, and the keel was laid on 13 March 1991 at Newport News Shipbuilding, Newport News, Virginia.

The ship was christened on 11 November 1993, in honor of Senator John Cornelius Stennis (D-Mississippi) who served in the Senate from 1947 to 1989.  The daughter of the ship's namesake, Mrs. Margaret Stennis-Womble, was the ship's sponsor. John C. Stennis was commissioned on 9 December 1995 at Naval Station Norfolk, Virginia, and she conducted flight deck certification in January 1996. The first arrested landing was by a VX-23 F-14B.  The ship conducted numerous carrier qualifications and independent steaming exercises off the East Coast throughout the next two years.  Included among these events was the first carrier landing of an F/A-18E/F Super Hornet on 18 January 1997.

1998

On 26 February 1998 with Carrier Air Wing Seven embarked, John C. Stennis left Norfolk for her maiden deployment, transiting the Suez Canal on 7 March and arriving in the Persian Gulf on 11 March 1998. John C. Stennis departed the Persian Gulf on 19 July 1998 for her new home port of Naval Air Station North Island in San Diego, California, arriving on 26 August 1998. In October 1998, she entered a six-month maintenance and upgrade period at North Island, returning to sea in April 1999. During the maintenance period, a jet blast deflector collapsed, severely injuring two sailors.

1999
In May 1999, the ship ran aground in a shallow area adjacent to the turning basin near North Island. Silt clogged the intake pipes to the steam condensing systems for the nuclear reactor plants, causing the carrier's two nuclear reactors to be shut down (one reactor by crew, the other automatically) for a period of 45 minutes. She was towed back to her pier for maintenance and observation for the next two days. The cleanup cost was about $2 million.

2000
On 7 January 2000, John C. Stennis deployed to the Persian Gulf to relieve  in Operation Southern Watch. During the deployment, the ship made port visits to South Korea, Hong Kong, Malaysia, Bahrain, the United Arab Emirates, Australia, Tasmania and Pearl Harbor, before returning to San Diego on 3 July 2000.

Following the September 11 attacks, John C. Stennis conducted Noble Eagle missions off the U.S. West Coast. In 2000 and 2001, John C. Stennis was part of Carrier Group 7.

2001
On 21 May 2001, the ship served as "the world's largest and most expensive outdoor theater" for the world premiere of the Disney film Pearl Harbor. More than 2,000 people attended the premiere on the ship, which had special grandstand seating and one of the world's largest movie screens assembled on the flight deck.

On 12 November 2001, two months earlier than scheduled, the ship left on her third deployment to the U.S. Fifth Fleet area of responsibility in support of Operation Enduring Freedom, returning to San Diego on 28 May 2002. From June 2002 to January 2003, JCS underwent a seven-month Planned Incremental Availability (PIA).

2004
From 24 May to 1 November 2004, John C. Stennis conducted her fourth major overseas deployment, participating in Exercise Northern Edge 2004 in the Gulf of Alaska, Rim of the Pacific (RimPac) Exercise off Hawaii, exercises with Kitty Hawk off Japan and goodwill visits to Japan, Malaysia and Western Australia.  Shortly after returning from deployment to San Diego, JCS changed her home port to Naval Station Bremerton, Washington on 19 January 2005.  Once at Bremerton, John C. Stennis underwent an 11-month docking planned incremental availability (DPIA), the first time she had been dry-docked since commissioning. Upgrades included a new mast. The new mast's structure is the first of its kind. A new type of steel alloy was used, making it stiffer and thicker than before. The new mast is also heavier and taller, allowing it to support new antennae the old mast would not have been able to support. Other upgrades included the installation of a new integrated bridge system in the pilothouse that will save manpower and provide state-of-the-art displays.

Following the maintenance cycle and pre-deployment training exercises, the carrier returned to Bremerton, Washington, and the carrier was certified surge ready, meaning the ship maintained a high state of readiness in case of an unscheduled deployment.

2007

On 20 January 2007, the carrier and her group set sail for the Persian Gulf as part of an increase in US military presence. John C. Stennis arrived in the area on 19 February 2007, joining  in the United States Fifth Fleet area of operations. This marked the first time since 2003 that there were two aircraft carrier battle groups in the region simultaneously.

On 23 May 2007, John C. Stennis, along with eight other warships including the aircraft carrier  and amphibious assault ship , passed through the Strait of Hormuz. US Navy officials said it was the largest such move since 2003.

On 31 August 2007 John C. Stennis returned to Bremerton.

2009
John C. Stennis departed Bremerton for a 6-month deployment to the western Pacific on 13 January 2009. On 24 April, the ship arrived in Singapore. That same day, one of the ship's sailors was crushed and killed while working from a small harbor boat to secure a drain that discharges oily water from the aircraft catapults.

On 29 April, the ship's executive officer, Commander David L. Burnham, was relieved by Rear Admiral Mark A. Vance over unspecified personal conduct.  Burnham was reassigned to a base in San Diego, pending an investigation.

After participating in exercises with Japan Maritime Self Defense Force and the Republic of Korea, as well as joint exercise Northern Edge 2009, John C. Stennis returned from deployment in early July 2009.  Carrier Air Wing 9 debarked on 6 July at NAS North Island, prior to the ship's arrival at her homeport of Bremerton on 10 July.

2011

The aircraft was at full power, in tension on the catapult when the accident occurred. Eleven flight deck crewmen were injured while the pilot was unhurt. There was no major damage to the carrier but the aircraft was a total loss.

On 18 December 2011, the final command-and-control mission for U.S. forces over Iraq was flown by an E-2C Hawkeye (pictured) from Carrier Airborne Early Warning Squadron 112 (VAW-112), catapulting off the carrier John C. Stennis at 7:32 am and returning at 11:04 a.m, both local time.  This mission effectively ended U.S. naval support for Operation New Dawn.

2012
On 3 January 2012, Iranian General Ataollah Salehi warned John C. Stennis "not to return to the Persian Gulf." The United States dismissed the warning.

On 7 January, John C. Stennis led the rescue of an Iranian-flagged fishing vessel, Al Mulahi, following her seizure by pirates. The pirates ambushed the ship and Iranian flag to search for other ships to hijack, while holding the original crew hostage. When some of the pirates attempted to board a Bahamian-flagged cargo ship, Sunshine, she radioed for assistance.  John C. Stennis dispatched a helicopter and cruiser to assist. A boarding party captured the pirates who attacked Sunshine, fed them, then released them temporarily.  A helicopter then secretly followed the pirates back to their mother ship, Al Mulahi.  Crew from the destroyer  then boarded the fishing vessel (upon permission in Urdu from the captain), and arrested all of the pirates with no casualties.

On 2 March 2012, John C. Stennis returned home from her 7-month deployment to homeport Bremerton, Washington.

On 7 July 2012, crew members were informed that John C. Stennis would be returning to the Middle East in August, much sooner than expected.

On 27 August 2012, John C. Stennis departed to the Middle East originally for six months, but was extended to eight.

2013

On 1 April 2013, the ship arrived at Changi Naval Base in Singapore. Local ITE students were invited for a guided tour inside the aircraft carrier.

Following that the ship sailed to Pearl Harbor, where she performed a week long tiger cruise  to San Diego 

At 12:45 on 3 May 2013, John C. Stennis arrived at her home port of Naval Base Kitsap in Bremerton, Washington, the completion of a ten-month,  deployment to the western Pacific Ocean. During this deployment, squadron aircraft flew more than 1,300 sorties from the carrier's deck in the war in Afghanistan.

On 27 June, the ship entered Dry Dock at Puget Sound Naval Shipyard and Intermediate Maintenance Facility (PSNS & IMF) to begin her scheduled 16 month Docking Planned Incremental Availability (DPIA). Work included preserving and painting the ship's hull, upgrading the propulsion plant, refurbishing the crew's berthing compartments, and a complete replacement of the ship's computer networks and work stations.

2014
John C. Stennis completed her Docking Planned Incremental Availability (DPIA) on 5 November 2014. After a six-day sea trial, the ship certified on 10 November as a Naval Operational asset.

2015

In mid-January 2015, John C. Stennis departed her home port of Naval Base Kitsap in Bremerton, Washington, and arrived at Naval Magazine Indian Island to load munitions prior to departing for San Diego to receive aircraft and another 2,000 sailors. On 1 September, the carrier arrived back at Bremerton, Washington.

2016
On 15 January 2016, John C. Stennis left Naval Base Kitsap for a scheduled deployment to the Western Pacific. On 19 April she arrived to Singapore for a regularly scheduled port visit after completing an annual bilateral training exercise in the Philippines. On 26 April 2016, China denied John C. Stennis, and her escort ships, permission to make a port visit to Hong Kong. On 10 August, the carrier arrived in San Diego, California for offload and disembarkation of CVW-9.  On 14 August, John C. Stennis arrived back to homeport, Naval Base Kitsap, finishing a Western Pacific deployment and RIMPAC exercise.

2017
From February to August 2017, John C. Stennis was in overhaul at the Puget Sound Naval Shipyard.

2018
On 2 August 2018, the Navy announced that John C. Stennis would change homeport to Norfolk, Virginia in advance of her refueling and complex overhaul (RCOH) at Newport News Shipbuilding.  will move from San Diego to Naval Base Kitsap to go through a period of maintenance at Puget Sound and  will replace Carl Vinson at San Diego.

On 12 December 2018, John C. Stennis launched her first combat sorties in support of Operation Freedom's Sentinel in Afghanistan.

2019
On 16 May 2019, John C. Stennis arrived in her new home port of Norfolk, Virginia in preparation for her refueling and complex overhaul (RCOH) in 2020. RCOH is expected to be completed sometime in the mid 2020s.

2021
On 7 May 2021, John C. Stennis went into Newport News for her midlife Refuel and Complex Overhaul (RCOH). The overhaul is expected to be completed by 2025.

Ship's seal

John C. Stenniss seal was produced from the combined efforts of several crew members with historical help from Stennis Center for Public Service, John C. Stennis Space Center and United States Senate Historian. The seal implies peace through strength, just as Senator John C. Stennis was referred to as an "unwavering advocate of peace through strength" by President Ronald Reagan, when the ship's name was announced in June 1988.

The circular shape signifies the Nimitz-class aircraft carrier's unique capability to circle the world without refueling while providing a forward presence from the sea. The predominant colors are red, white, blue and gold, the same as those of the United States and the Navy. The outer border, taken from one version of a U.S. Senate crest, represents the strength through unity of the ship's crew. The four gold bands and eight ties denote John C. Stennis' four decades (41 years) in the Senate and the eight presidents he served with, from President Truman to President Reagan. The seven stars in the blue border represent his seven terms in the Senate and characterize John C. Stennis as the seventh Nimitz-class aircraft carrier. The red and white stripes inside the blue border represent the American flag and the American people John C. Stennis serves. They also honor the courage and sacrifice of the United States' armed forces.

The eagle and shield is a representation of the gilt eagle and shield overlooking the Old Senate Chamber. The shield represents the United States of America. The twenty stars represent the US's twentieth state, Mississippi, the home of John C. Stennis. The three arrows in the eagle's talons symbolize the ship's and air wing's ability to project power. The eagle is representative of John C. Stennis' stature in the Senate, where he was respected and admired as a "soaring eagle" by some of his colleagues.

The ship herself is pictured in the seal. On the edges of the flight deck are the words "Honor, Courage, Commitment" which are the United States Navy's Core Values.

The seal, after selection by the ship's crew, was submitted to Mrs. Margaret Stennis Womble, the ship's sponsor and daughter of Senator Stennis, and to Mrs. John Hampton Stennis, the matron of honor and wife of Senator Stennis' son, for their approval. In February 1995 they approved the design.

Ship's name controversy
The ship's name was originally approved by then-president Ronald Reagan in 1988. As of 2021, the ship's name was the subject of renewed controversy due to Senator Stennis's outspoken opposition to civil rights and racial equality, and his extensive record of legislative support for racial segregation. The controversy is part of a larger reassessment of military bases, ships and other U.S. military assets named after Confederate generals and other persons associated with slavery and racial segregation.

See also
 List of aircraft carriers
 List of aircraft carriers of the United States Navy

References

External links

 Official  website 
 Story Archive – U.S. Navy – USS John C. Stennis (CVN 74)
 John C. Stennis at globalsecurity.org
 USS John C. Stennis history at U.S. Carriers
This American Life: Somewhere in the Arabian Sea Episode 206
 USS John C. Stennis (CVN-74) command histories – Naval History & Heritage Command
 John C. Stennis on Naval History and Heritage Command

 

Nimitz-class aircraft carriers
1993 ships
Aircraft carriers of the United States
Nuclear ships of the United States Navy
Ships built in Newport News, Virginia